Bernard Noël (19 November 1930 – 13 April 2021) was a French writer and poet. He received the Grand Prix national de la poésie (National Grand Prize of Poetry) in 1992 and the Prix Robert Ganzo (Robert Ganzo Prize) in 2010.

Biography
Noël published his first book of poetry, Les Yeux Chimeres, in 1955. This was followed by the prose poems Extraits du corps (Essence of the body or Extracts from the text) in 1958.

He then waited nine years before publishing his next book, La Face de silence (The Face of Silence, 1967), and eventually the controversial Le Château de Cène (Castle supper, 1969), erotic fiction that has been read as a protest against the war in Algeria. Noël is also known for his artists' books in collaboration with Gérard Serée. He also kept up a correspondence with the Italian poetess Nella Nobili when she moved to Paris.

Notes

1930 births
2021 deaths
People from Aveyron
French erotica writers
French literary critics
French art critics
20th-century French poets
21st-century French poets
21st-century French male writers
20th-century French novelists
21st-century French novelists
French translators
Prix France Culture winners
Translators to French
20th-century French dramatists and playwrights
21st-century French dramatists and playwrights
20th-century French male writers
French male non-fiction writers
Prix Guillaume Apollinaire winners